Eugene Harold Bradley (November 23, 1913 – June 14, 1981) was an American football end in the National Football League for the Washington Redskins and the Chicago Cardinals.  He played college football at Elon University.

External links

1913 births
1981 deaths
Players of American football from Winston-Salem, North Carolina
American football wide receivers
Elon Phoenix football players
Washington Redskins players
Chicago Cardinals players